is a Japanese tokusatsu television drama produced by Kadokawa Pictures and broadcast on TV Tokyo. The series premiered on April 2, 2010. The series retells the story of the original Daimajin film in a modern Japanese setting. Consisting of 26 episodes, the series was prefaced by a manga by Seijuro Mizu in Young Ace magazine. Writing for the series is shared by Shinji Ōishi and Naruhisa Arakawa.

Episodes
Each episode of the series has its own unique kanji, but they are all read as "Kanon".

 - April 2, 2010
 - April 9, 2010
 - April 16, 2010
 - April 23, 2010
 - April 30, 2010
 - May 7, 2010
 - May 14, 2010
 - May 21, 2010
 - June 4, 2010
 - June 11, 2010
 - June 18, 2010
 - June 25, 2010
 - July 2, 2010
 - July 9, 2010
 - July 16, 2010
 - July 23, 2010
 - July 30, 2010
 - August 6, 2010
 - August 13, 2010
 - August 20, 2010
 - August 27, 2010
 - September 3, 2010
 - September 10, 2010
 - September 17, 2010
 - September 24, 2010
 - October 1, 2010

Cast
 : 
 : 
 : 
 : 
 : 
 : 
 : 
 : 
 : 
 : 
 : 
 : 
 : 
  & Narration: 
  & : 
 : 
 : 
 : 
 : 
 : 
 : 
 : 
 : 
 :

Theme songs
All songs were written by Shoko Fujibayashi and composed by Toshihiko Sahashi.
Opening theme
 "Sing Your Heart Out"
 Artist: Ryoko Moriyama
Closing themes Both songs performed by Lia
 
 Episodes: 1-13
 
 Episodes: 14-26

References

External links
 Official website
 Official TV Tokyo website

Tokusatsu television series
2010 Japanese television series debuts
Japanese drama television series
2010 Japanese television series endings
TV Tokyo original programming